The Ljubljana Marshes Wheel is a wooden wheel that was found in the Ljubljana Marsh some  south of Ljubljana, the capital of Slovenia, in 2002. Radiocarbon dating, performed in the VERA laboratory (Vienna Environmental Research Accelerator) in Vienna, showed that it was approximately 5,100-5,350 years old, which makes it the oldest wooden wheel yet discovered. It was discovered by a team of Slovene archeologists from the Ljubljana Institute of Archaeology, a part of the Research Center at the Slovene Academy of Arts and Sciences, under the guidance of Anton Velušček.

The archaeological site
Remains of pile dwellings were discovered in the Ljubljana Marsh as early as in 1875. Since 2011, the site has been protected as a UNESCO World Heritage Site as an example of prehistoric pile dwellings around the Alps, a special form of dwellings in areas with lakes and marshes. The archaeologists at the excavation site identified over one thousand piles in the bed of the Iška River, near Ig. The analyses of the piles revealed that the dwellings were repaired each year and that a new house had to be built on the same place in as little as 10 to 20 years.

The earliest inhabitants settled in the region as early as 9,000 years ago. In the Mesolithic, they built temporary residences on isolated rocks in the marsh and on the fringe, living by hunting and gathering. The permanent settlements were not built until the first farmers appeared approximately 6,000 years ago during the Neolithic.

The wooden wheel
The wooden wheel belonged to a prehistoric two-wheel cart – a pushcart. Similar wheels have been found in the hilly regions of Switzerland and southwest Germany, but the Ljubljana Marshes wheel is bigger and older. It shows that wooden wheels may have appeared almost simultaneously in Mesopotamia and Europe, though finds of actual wheels from Mesopotamia date from significantly later.

The axle was attached to the wheels with oak wood wedges, which meant that the axle rotated together with the wheels. The wheel was made from a tree that grew in the vicinity of the pile dwellings and at the time of the wheel construction was approximately 80 years old.

It appears that the wheel itself is primarily made of two planks of wood which are held together with four cross braces. The cross braces appear to have been held in place simply by a tenon arrangement, the braces being fitted into tenoned slots carved into the two main wheel sections.

See also
Prehistoric Europe

References

Further reading
 Velušček, Anton (ed.) (2009). Stare Gmajne Pile-Dwelling Settlement and its Era (bilingual English and Slovenian edition). Založba ZRC. .

Archaeological discoveries in Slovenia
Prehistoric Slovenia
Copper Age Europe
Wheels
2002 archaeological discoveries